Arig (Arab Re-Insurance Group) was founded in 1980, Established by the governments of Kuwait, Libya and the United Arab Emirates, is the largest Arab owned re-insurer. Arig is listed on the stock exchanges in Bahrain, Dubai and Kuwait and held by nearly 5000 individual share holders.

External links
Arab Insurance Group (Head Office) 
Singapore Branch

References

Financial services companies established in 1980
Reinsurance companies
Insurance companies of Bahrain
Companies listed on the Bahrain Bourse
Bahraini companies established in 1980